The Chinese Ambassador to Slovenia is the official representative of the People's Republic of China to Slovenia.

List of representatives

See also

References 

Ambassadors of China to Slovenia
Slovenia
China